Lake Pasteur is a long and narrow fjord-like lake in the Côte-Nord region of Quebec, Canada.

Location

The lake is extremely elongated, as are Lake Walker and Lake Quatre Lieues in the same watershed.
The Pasteur River enters the north end of the lake, and leaves the south end to join the Aux Rochers River.

Lake Pasteur is in the unorganized territory of Lac-Walker, in the Sept-Rivières Regional County Municipality.
Its name is mentioned in the Dictionnaire des rivières et des lacs de la province de Québec (Dictionary of Rivers and Lakes of the Province of Quebec) in 1925. 
It was named after the French chemist and biologist Louis Pasteur (1822–1895), who discovered microbial life and invented pasteurization.

Environment

The lake is in the proposed Lake Pasteur Biodiversity Reserve, in the Sainte Marguerite Plateau, a natural region in the Central Laurentian natural province.
The terrain is hilly, covered with glacial till.
A map of the Ecological regions of Quebec shows the area of the reserve belongs to the eastern spruce/moss domain of the boreal zone.

Sediment

A study of short gravity core samples along transects in the nearby fjord-lakes Pasteur, Walker and Pentecôte, published in 2018, evaluated the distribution of laminated post-glacial segments and the potential for formation of annual sedimentary layers, or varves.
Four main types of sedimentary facies were identified: laminated, partially laminated, bioturbated and massive sediments.
Lake Pentecôte mainly holds massive, partially laminated sediments.
Lake Pasteur holds partially laminated sediments and non-annual sediments similar to varves. 
Lake Walker holds laminated sediments that probably are varves. 
The difference is probably due to the greater depth of Lake Walker, among other factors.

History

In November 1922 there was a deadly boating accident on the lake when the schooner Amoria was holed by early ice formed on the lake and sank.
Ten people died, including Father Auguste Tortellier and Doctor Roméo Vézina.

Notes

Sources

Lakes of Côte-Nord